Apollo Sunshine was an alternative rock band from Boston, Massachusetts.

History

Founding
Sam Cohen, Jesse Gallagher, and Jeremy Black originally met in 1997 in Boston,
where the three were attending a Berklee College of Music summer performance program.

Albums
The band released their first album, Katonah, in 2003 on SpinART records. The album was recorded in Katonah, New York in a barn which the band converted into a studio, and produced by Andy Edelstein, a professor at Berklee. The first single, "I Was on the Moon", was released in 2003.

The New York Times described their sound as "bouncy 60's-style melodies crack wide open, breaking into outbursts of pummeling and feedback before jumping back into the tune. It's all neatly and cleverly plotted, but with a looming chaos that's anything but nostalgic."

The band released their second album Apollo Sunshine in 2005. In November 2005, it was named to the Amazon.com Best of 2005: Editors' Picks in Rock list at number 5 and the band was featured in Rolling Stone as an "Artist to Watch". Several Boston alternative weeklies declared Apollo Sunshine the best Boston band in their 2005 year-end issues. In 2006, Apollo Sunshine toured with The Slip and Sam Champion en route to SXSW. 

Their third album, Shall Noise Upon, was released on vinyl and as a digital download on August 5, 2008. It was released on CD September 2, 2008.

The band has been inactive since 2010.

Etymology

Members

Current
Sam Cohen - Guitar, Vocals, Pedal Steel
Jesse Gallagher - Vocals, Bass, Guitar, Keyboards
Jeremy Black - Drums

Former
Oli Rah - Percussion
Quentin Stoltzfus- Guitar, Vocals
Sean Aylward - Guitar, Vocals

Discography

Studio albums

EPs
The Other Side of the World EP (May 3, 2005)

Live albums
Live at the Paradise (2005)

Singles

References

Sources
 James Sullivan What a racket - Apollo Sunshine The Boston Globe, September 2, 2008
 Joan Anderman Critic's picks - pop music - Spare Change Benefit The Boston Globe, August 10, 2008

External links

Live show photos of APOLLO SUNSHINE by Space Monkey
Headless Heroes (record label)
Black & Greene Records (for Apollo Sunshine vinyl releases)
Apollo Sunshine on Myspace
Apollo Sunshine Announce New Album, 2008 Tour Dates
Short review of the August 4, 2008 Union Pool Show

Berklee College of Music alumni
Musical groups from Massachusetts
Musical groups established in 2003
Musical groups disestablished in 2010
Alternative rock groups from Massachusetts
SpinART Records artists